The 2013 6 Hours of São Paulo was an endurance auto race held at the Autódromo José Carlos Pace, São Paulo, Brazil on 30 August – 1 September 2013.  The race was the fourth round of the 2013 FIA World Endurance Championship and the second consecutive running of the 6 Hours of São Paulo.  Audi continued their streak of four overall victories following an accident for the sole Toyota in LMP1, with André Lotterer, Marcel Fässler, and Benoît Tréluyer leading the Joest Racing duo to the checkered flag.  G-Drive Racing earned their first victory in the LMP2 category ahead of OAK Racing, while AF Corse Ferrari led home Aston Martin Racing in the LMGTE Pro class by a gap of less than two seconds.  Aston Martin however prevailed in LMGTE Am, ahead of the 8 Star Ferrari.

Qualifying result
Pole position winners in each class are marked in bold.

  The No. 61 AF Corse Ferrari was deemed to be below the minimum ride height in post-qualifying scrutineering.  The car was penalized to the back of the starting grid.
  The No. 57 Krohn Ferrari and No. 76 IMSA Porsche both had drivers who failed to meet the minimum lap time requirements.  Both cars were penalized to the back of the starting grid.
  Although the No. 25 Delta-ADR Oreca-Nissan failed to set a qualifying time, the car was allowed to start from the back of the LMP2 field on the grid for safety reasons.

Race result
Class winners in bold.  Cars failing to complete 70% of winner's distance marked as Not Classified (NC).

References

2013 in Brazilian motorsport
2013 FIA World Endurance Championship season
2013